The canton of Charente-Champagne is an administrative division of the Charente department, southwestern France. It was created at the French canton reorganisation which came into effect in March 2015. Its seat is in Châteauneuf-sur-Charente.

It consists of the following communes:
 
Angeac-Champagne
Angeac-Charente
Bellevigne
Birac
Bonneuil
Bouteville
Châteauneuf-sur-Charente
Criteuil-la-Magdeleine
Gensac-la-Pallue
Genté
Graves-Saint-Amant
Juillac-le-Coq
Lignières-Ambleville
Mosnac-Saint-Simeux
Saint-Fort-sur-le-Né
Saint-Preuil
Saint-Simon
Salles-d'Angles
Segonzac
Verrières
Vibrac

References

Cantons of Charente